Joseph Weld may refer to: 
 Captain Joseph Weld (1599-1646), Weld family#Joseph Weld, ancestor of many Boston Welds
Joseph Weld (yachtsman), English yachtsman (1777–1863), brother of Cardinal Thomas Weld
Joseph Weld (MP) (1651–1712), MP for Bury St Edmunds 1709–1712
 Joseph Weld (priest) (?–1781), Archdeacon of Ross
 Joseph William Weld (1909–1992), British army officer and landowner